Dundalk Gaels GFC is a GAA club from Dundalk, County Louth, Ireland which fields Gaelic football teams in competitions organized by Louth GAA.

Catchment area
The club recruits members from such neighbourhoods as the Carrick Road, Avenue Road, Hill Street, Dublin Road and the Friary school area. Many past and present players of the Gaels were educated at Friary National school.

Current status
Managed by Cathal O'Hanlon, Gaels are currently the only Dundalk town club competing at senior championship level in Louth football. Their Division 1 League status was lost however after a relegation play-off defeat to Dreadnots in October of 2022.

Rivalries
The club's principal rivals are cross-town neighbours Clan Na Gael, to whom they lost in the 1992 Louth SFC final replay.
Additionally, matches against Seán O'Mahony's and Dundalk Young Irelands are always keenly contested.

Notable Players
 Benny McArdle - centre back on county side that reached semi-final of the All-Ireland Under-21 Football Championship in 1978, losing narrowly to Kerry. Also won Dublin Senior Football Championship medal with Erin's Hope in same year.

 David Coleman - Club's main scoring threat for many years from early 1990s to mid 2000s. Also played in League of Ireland for Dundalk F.C.

 Davy McDonnell - Captain of  Intermediate championship winners in 1987. Regular in Louth's midfield from mid-1980's to 1995.

 Derek Crilly - Forward, Played for Louth between 2008 and 2017.

 Jack Regan - captained Louth in semi-finals of the All-Ireland Senior Football Championship in both 1943 and 1953. Won three SFC titles with the Gaels in 1942, 1945 and 1952. Selected at midfield on Louth Millennium team.

 Jim McArdle - Scored two of Louth's goals against Kerry in 1936 All-Ireland minor final victory. Played for Dundalk F.C. in 1942 FAI Cup Final victory over Cork United.

 Joe Carroll - columnist with Dundalk Democrat newspaper. Goalkeeper in 1973 on last Louth team to beat Dublin in the Leinster Senior Football Championship.

 Packie O'Connor - Winner of Junior and Intermediate championship medals with the club. Played midfield for Louth 1984-87. Also played with Dundalk F.C. first team.

 Paul Kenny - Former county defender who managed Louth to two Leinster semi-finals in 1996 and 1997 during his three years in charge.

 Peter McGinnity - Winner of Minor and two Intermediate Championships. 2003 team captain when Leinster Intermediate Club Football Championship was won. Louth captain in 2007.

 Ray Rooney - defender, Louth panellist from late 1990s to early 2000s.

Honours
 Louth Senior Football Championship (3): 1942, 1945, 1952
  Division 1 Football League Champions (3): 1942, 1943, 1944
 Leinster Intermediate Club Football Championship (1): 2003
 Louth Intermediate Football Championship (4): 1987, 1991, 2003, 2007
 Louth Junior Football Championship (2): 1933, 1986
 Louth Under-21 Football Championship (2): 1991, 1992
 Louth Minor Football Championship (6): 1933, 1934, 1962, 1974, 1989, 1997
 Louth Minor 'B' Football Championship (2): 2008, 2021
 Louth Under-16 Football Championship (1): 2002
 Louth Under-14 Football Championship (2): 1987, 1990
 ACC/Paddy Sheelan Cup (5): 1982, 1991, 1992, 1993, 1999
 Senior Football League Division 2 (3): 2007, 2012, 2016
 Senior Football League Division 2A (2): 2003, 2006
 Senior Football League Division 3 (2): 1983, 1985
 DMP/Paddy Sheelan Shield/Grogan Cup (2): 1991, 2006
 Kevin Mullen Shield (3): 1983, 1984, 1985
 Junior 2A Championship (1): 2011
 Junior 2B Championship (1): 2006
 Division 4 Junior League (1): 2017
 Division 4A Junior League (2): 1986, 1995
 Division 4B Junior League (1): 2003

References

External sources
 

Gaelic games clubs in County Louth
Gaelic football clubs in County Louth